The M1129 Mortar Carrier is an 8×8 wheeled armored mortar carrier of the Stryker family of combat vehicles produced by General Dynamics Land Systems. It is in use with the United States Army. Models with the double V-hull upgrade are known as the M1252 MCVV.

Description
The M1129 Mortar Carrier, also known as MCV-B (Mortar Carrier Vehicle version B), is based on the Stryker infantry carrier vehicle, which is itself a descendant of the Swiss Mowag Piranha III.

The precursor of the M1129, the MCV-A, carried a mortar that could only be used dismounted, whereas the M1129B is only capable of firing its weapon from the mounted position within the vehicle.

The M1129 is used in the US Army Stryker Brigade Combat Teams, where it is part of each Brigade's maneuver infantry battalion's and Reconnaissance, Surveillance & Target Acquisition (RSTA) squadron's Modified Table of Organization & Equipment (MTOE). The vehicles are either organically subordinated to battalion level or company level. The battalion level vehicles are armed with the  RMS6L 120MM mortar system, which is the vehicle mounted version of the RMS6L 120MM mortar and Cardom. Additionally, they carry the 81mm M252 mortar that can only be used in a dismounted capacity. The company level vehicles also carry a vehicle-mounted 120mm mortar, which is augmented by the 60mm M224 mortar for dismounted use. The RSTA squadron only receives the 120mm mounted mortar, there is no augmentation dismounted maneuvers.  Each Stryker infantry battalion thus has a total number of 10 mortar carriers, all of which are equipped with the 120mm system. Each Stryker RSTA battalion has a total of 6 mortar carriers, all of which are also equipped with the 120mm system.

The first M1129 vehicles were put into service in Spring 2005 with the 172nd Stryker Brigade Combat Team. The 172nd Stryker Brigade deployed to Iraq in August 2005 being the first unit to fire the M1129/MCV-B in theatre.

Gallery

See also 
 Cardom – the Soltam Systems recoil mortar system
 Dragon Fire – a similar project by the US Marines, also known as Expeditionary Fire Support System (EFSS).
 M1064 mortar carrier – in use with the Army, based on the M113 tracked vehicle.
 XM1204 Non-Line-of-Sight Mortar, U.S. Army Future Combat Systems mortar carrier canceled in 2009
 Light-weight Combat Vehicle (LCV) System
 Amored Multi-Purpose Vehicle, a development of the Bradley fighting vehicle with a mortar carrier variant, the XM1287, to replace the M1064 mortar carrier

References

External links
The M1129 at globalsecurity.org

Self-propelled artillery of the United States
Mortar carriers
Post–Cold War armored fighting vehicles of the United States
General Dynamics land vehicles
Wheeled self-propelled artillery
Mowag Piranha